This is an overview of the progression of the Olympic track cycling record of the men's team sprint as recognised by the Union Cycliste Internationale (UCI).

The men's team sprint was introduced at the 2012 Summer Olympics.

Progression
♦ denotes a performance that is also a current world record.  Statistics are correct as of the end of the 2020 Summer Olympics.

During the Qualification session there were several teams who rode a new best time and so had temporary the Olympic Record. They are not listed as Olympic Record holders because they did not win the qualification session. These countries who had temporary the Olympic record are:
 Heat 1: : Hersony Canelón, César Marcano, Angel Polgar in a time of 44.654
 Heat 2: : Cheng Changsong, Zhang Lei, Zhang Miao in a time of 43.751
 Heat 3: : Sergey Borisov, Denis Dmitriev, Sergey Kucherov in a time of 43.681
 Heat 4: : Grégory Baugé, Michaël D'Almeida, Kévin Sireau in a time of 43.097

References

Track cycling Olympic record progressions